When Giants Collide is a 2007 documentary directed and produced by Christina Fulton.

Overview
Documentary about the plight of the Beverly Hills High School wrestling program.

References

External links

2007 films
2007 documentary films
American independent films
Documentary films about Los Angeles
Sport wrestling films
Documentary films about high school in the United States
High school sports in California
Scholastic wrestling
Films set in Beverly Hills, California
2000s English-language films
2000s American films
2007 independent films
English-language documentary films